PocketVNC is a C VNC server that runs on Windows CE based devices, such as Windows Mobile and PocketPC smartphones, PDAs and Barcode Scanner, as well as on Windows CE based industrial terminals. PocketVNC support version 3.8 of the Remote Framebuffer Protocol and can handle file transfer in combination with UltraVNC clients.

External links
 

Proprietary software
Remote desktop
Thin clients